Coulter railway station served the village of Coulter, South Lanarkshire, Scotland from 1860 to 1965 on the Symington, Biggar and Broughton Railway.

History 
The station opened on 5 November 1860 by the Symington, Biggar and Broughton Railway. The station closed to passengers on 5 June 1950 and to goods traffic on 1 March 1965.

References

External links 

Disused railway stations in South Lanarkshire
Former Caledonian Railway stations
Railway stations in Great Britain opened in 1860
Railway stations in Great Britain closed in 1950
1860 establishments in Scotland
1965 disestablishments in Scotland